Harry M. Bell was an American football and basketball coach. He served in the head football coach at Des Moines University in Des Moines, Iowa from 1920 to 1923, Lombard College in Galesburg, Illinois in 1924 to 1929, Butler University in Indianapolis, Indiana from 1930 to 1931, and at Illinois Wesleyan University in Bloomington, Illinois from 1935 to 1938. Bell was also the head basketball coach at Illinois Wesleyan from 1935 to 1939, tallying a mark of 51–31.

Head coaching record

College football

References

Year of birth missing
Year of death missing
Butler Bulldogs football coaches
Butler Bulldogs athletic directors
Des Moines Tigers basketball coaches
Des Moines Tigers football coaches
Drake Bulldogs football coaches
Illinois Wesleyan Titans football coaches
Illinois Wesleyan Titans men's basketball coaches
Lombard Olive football coaches
High school football coaches in Iowa
Drake University alumni